Black Diamond is a city in King County, Washington, United States. The population was 4,697 at the 2020 census. In 2021, with a 21% growth rate, Black Diamond was the fastest growing small city in King County.

History

Founding 
Black Diamond was originally inhabited by the Bəqəlšuł, which is Lushootseed for "from a high point from which you can see", part of Coast Salish people. The area was home to a grill trap and smokehouse, and the tribe fished from Lake Sawyer.

Black Diamond was officially incorporated on February 19, 1959. The town's late 20th century population growth has been mostly as a commuter community for people with jobs in Seattle, Bellevue, and suburban centers within the Seattle Metropolitan Area.

Coal mining 
Beginning in the 1880s Black Diamond was a rural coal mining area, developed by the Black Diamond Coal Mining Company of California, which owned and operated the mine.  The original residents were largely composed of former workers, from the company's previous coal mining operation in Nortonville, California, which primarily sold coal to the thriving new metropolis of San Francisco.  A combination of low quality coal from the Nortonville mines, water intrusion into the workings there, and the discovery and economical transport of higher-quality Washington coal to San Francisco spelled the demise of Nortonville in the early 1880s. The town was home to around 3,500 people by the early 1900s, many of them European immigrants; most of the working men were involved in producing coal.  This coal was transported to Seattle via the Pacific Coast Coal train. Before 1911, the miners were affiliated with the United Mine Workers of America (UMWA), but by March 1911 had left en masse to join the Industrial Workers of the World (IWW).

After World War I, the town shut down the mine as it was no longer viable. However a second mining boom spurred growth in the town in the early 1930s on the strength of multiple mining operations promoted by the Morris brothers through the Palmer Coking Coal Company.  Mining has continued until recently through the Pacific Coast Coal Company, formerly of San Francisco.  The prospect of future mining operations remains strong.

The main building of the Black Diamond Historical Museum is the former train station, which served the Columbia & Puget Sound Railway 1884–1916 and the Pacific Coast Railway 1916–1951. Regular passenger service ended in 1925, but a train still brought men to the mine until 1931, and trains continued to haul coal and freight into the 1940s.

Planned growth via master planned developments (MPDs) 
In the 1990's, the first Black Diamond city planner (Jason Paulsen), seized an opportunity to create a comprehensive development plan for the City of Black Diamond that when completed, would fundamentally change what and how the City of Black Diamond would evolve into — the first set of plans being the Growth Management Act (GMA) Comprehensive Plan, which included the concept of Master Planned Developments (MPDs).

In 2008 156 acres are purchased for the first MPD. In 2010 the first MPDs applications are filed with the City of Black Diamond.

Legal action against first MPDs 
From 2010 through 2018 legal battles were fought delaying development of the first MPDs:

 In 2010 Toward Responsible Development filed a land use petition (LUPA) against the first two MPDs. 
 In 2012 King County Superior Court denied the LUPA Toward Responsible Development filed with the Court of Appeals.  
 In 2014 appeals Court Commissioner Masako Kanazawa ordered Toward Responsible Development to pay a total of $162,798, for attorney fees and costs, to YarrowBay and the City of Black Diamond. 
 In 2016 Oakpointe (formerly YarrowBay) sued three City of Black Diamond Council members who opposed the MPDs.  
 In 2017 Black Diamond council files suit against the mayor. 
 In 2018 Black Diamond / Oakpointe settle lawsuit.

First MPDs 
The first two MPDs comprised 6,050 single and multi-family residences, 1.1 million square feet of commercial/office/retail space and were estimated to 15,000 new residents to the City of Black Diamond; which would increase the population of the city by 3.6 times its size at the time (2010 population estimate of 4,151).

In Dec of 2013 development started on the first MPD; now known as Ten Trails. In 2019 the first family moves into Ten Trails. 

In 2021, with a 21% growth rate, Black Diamond was the fastest growing small city in King County.

In March of 2022, 845 households were occupied in Ten Trails (722 residential homes, 76 apartment units, and 47 rental homes). 

Using King County's 2020 Person's per house hold rate of 2.43, 845 households being occupied in Ten Trails in March of 2022, the estimated population of Black Diamond in 2021 being 5,839, concludes the estimated population living in Ten Trails in March of 2022 being 2,053 (845 * 2.43); which roughly equates to 35% ( 2,053 / 5,839) of the population of Black Diamond living in the first MPD (Ten Trails) during March of 2022.

Geography
Black Diamond is located at  (47.317802, -122.014793).

Demographics
Based on per capita income, one of the more reliable measures of affluence, Black Diamond ranks 64th of 522 areas in the state of Washington to be ranked.

2010 census
As of the census of 2010, there were 4,151 people, 1,546 households, and 1,157 families living in the city. The racial makeup of the city was 92.0% White, 1.2% African American, 0.7% Native American, 1.2% Asian, 0.3% Pacific Islander, 1.3% from other races, and 3.3% from two or more races. Hispanic or Latino of any race were 4.6% of the population.

There were 1,546 households, of which 37.5% had children under the age of 18 living with them, 62.0% were married couples living together, 8.6% had a female householder with no husband present, 4.3% had a male householder with no wife present, and 25.2% were non-families. 17.9% of all households were made up of individuals, and 6.1% had someone living alone who was 65 years of age or older. The average household size was 2.68 and the average family size was 3.05.

The median age in the city was 40.4 years. 25.2% of residents were under the age of 18; 7% were between the ages of 18 and 24; 25.7% were from 25 to 44; 32.1% were from 45 to 64; and 10% were 65 years of age or older. The gender makeup of the city was 49.8% male and 50.2% female.

2000 census
As of the census of 2000, there were 3,970 people, 1,456 households, and 1,131 families living in the city. The population density was 739.5 people per square mile (285.4/km2). There were 1,538 housing units at an average density of 286.5 per square mile (110.6/km2). The racial makeup of the city was 93.43% White, 0.08% African American, 1.56% Native American, 1.01% Asian, 0.05% Pacific Islander, 0.88% from other races, and 3.00% from two or more races. Hispanic or Latino of any race were 2.70% of the population. 16.8% were of German, 13.2% Irish, 8.5% English and 7.4% Norwegian ancestry.

There were 1,456 households, out of which 41.2% had children under the age of 18 living with them, 65.2% were married couples living together, 8.3% had a female householder with no husband present, and 22.3% were non-families. 17.2% of all households were made up of individuals, and 6.0% had someone living alone who was 65 years of age or older. The average household size was 2.73 and the average family size was 3.08.

In the city the population was spread out, with 28.5% under the age of 18, 6.2% from 18 to 24, 34.1% from 25 to 44, 22.9% from 45 to 64, and 8.3% who were 65 years of age or older. The median age was 36 years. For every 100 females, there were 103.6 males. For every 100 females age 18 and over, there were 101.6 males.

The median income for a household in the city was $67,092, and the median income for a family was $72,981. Males had a median income of $51,792 versus $31,932 for females. The per capita income for the city was $26,936. About 0.8% of families and 0.9% of the population were below the poverty line, including 0.9% of those under age 18 and none of those age 65 or over.

City landmarks
The City of Black Diamond has designated the following landmarks:

Government and politics
Black Diamond remains one of the few right-leaning or Republican areas in King County. While Donald Trump carried the city twice, he did so both times by small margins.

Notable people
The town has been home to some famous residents, including folk musician Brandi Carlile. The minor-league baseball star Edo Vanni was born at Black Diamond in 1918.

External links

 History of Black Diamond at HistoryLink

References

Cities in King County, Washington
Mining communities in Washington (state)
1959 establishments in Washington (state)
Company towns in Washington (state)
Cities in Washington (state)